Bella and the Bulldogs is an American comedy television series created by Jonathan Butler and Gabriel Garza that aired on Nickelodeon from January 17, 2015 to June 25, 2016. The series stars Brec Bassinger, Coy Stewart, Jackie Radinsky, Buddy Handleson, Lilimar, Haley Tju, and Rio Mangini.

Premise 
The series follows cheerleader Bella Dawson whose life in Texas takes an unexpected twist when she is recruited to become the new quarterback for her school's football team, the Bulldogs. At first, the rest of the team does not want her as the quarterback since she is a girl and it was an all boys middle school team, but they eventually accept her for her talent. As the show goes on it goes into her and her friends' teen drama and dating life.

Episodes

Cast

Main 
 Brec Bassinger as Bella Dawson
 Coy Stewart as Troy
 Jackie Radinsky as Sawyer
 Buddy Handleson as Newt
 Lilimar as Sophie
 Haley Tju as Pepper
 Rio Mangini as Ace (recurring: season 1, main: season 2)

Recurring 
 Dorien Wilson as Coach Russell
 Annie Tedesco as Carrie Dawson
 Nick Alvarez as Luis DelaRosa
 Matt Cornett as Zach Barnes
 Senta Moses Mikan as Mrs. Silverstein

Production 
On March 4, 2015, the series was renewed for a second season. The second season premiered on September 30, 2015. Actress Brec Bassinger stated in a Twitter message about the episode airing on June 25, 2016: "I hope y'all enjoyed the last episode of #bellaandthebulldogs ..."

Broadcast 
Bella and the Bulldogs premiered on March 18, 2015, on YTV in Canada and on Nickelodeon in Australia and New Zealand on April 4, 2015. The series premiered on the Southeast Asian feed of Nickelodeon in Singapore and the Philippines on April 6, 2015, and in Malaysia on April 11, 2015. In the United Kingdom and Ireland, Nickelodeon debuted the series on May 4, 2015. In Africa, the pilot debuted on June 26, 2015, and the series officially premiered on September 7, 2015.

Reception

Ratings 
 

| link2             = List of Bella and the Bulldogs episodes#Season 2 (2015–16)
| episodes2         = 20
| start2            = 
| end2              = 
| startrating2      = 1.49
| endrating2        = 1.49
| viewers2          = |2}} 
}}

Awards and nominations

References

External links 
 

2010s American comedy television series
2010s Nickelodeon original programming
2015 American television series debuts
2016 American television series endings
American sports television series
English-language television shows
Television shows set in Texas